Vaishali may refer to:

Places
 Vaishali district, a district in Bihar, India
 Vaishali (ancient city), an ancient city located in current Vaishali district
 Basarh, the modern location of the ancient city, often called Vaishali
 Vaishali (community development block)
 Vaishali (Lok Sabha constituency), a Lok Sabha constituency in Bihar
 Vaishali (Vidhan Sabha constituency), an assembly constituency in Bihar
 Vaishali metro station, a metro station of Delhi Metro in Ghaziabad
 Vaishali Nagar (Jaipur), a neighborhood in Jaipur, Rajasthan, India

People
 Vaishali Bankar, mayor of Pune, Maharashtra, India
 Vaishali Desai (born 1989), Indian model and actress
 Vaishali Mhade (born 1984), Indian-Marathi singer, winner of Zee TV's reality series Sa Re Ga Ma Pa Challenge 2009
 Vaishali Kasaravalli (1952–2010), Indian Kannada actor, television serial director and costume designer
 Vaishali Samant, Indian-Marathi singer from Maharashtra; popular for her song "Aaika Dagiba"
 Vaishali Thakkar (born 1964), Indian actress
 Vaishali Rameshbabu (born 2001), Indian chess player

Other uses
 Eeram, a 2009 Tamil film dubbed in Telugu as Vaishali
 Vaisali (film), a 1988 Malayalam film directed and edited by Bharathan
 Vaishali Express, a train running between stations Barauni and New Delhi, India
 Vaishali (restaurant), a restaurant in Pune, Maharashtra, India